Before the Act of Union 1707, the barons of the sheriffdom or shire of Dumfries (also called Nithsdale) and the stewartry of Annandale elected commissioners to represent them in the unicameral Parliament of Scotland and in the Convention of Estates. The number of commissioners was increased from two to four in 1690.

After 1708, Dumfriesshire returned one member to the House of Commons of Great Britain and later to the House of Commons of the United Kingdom..

List of shire commissioners

 1628–33, 1639–41, 1643, 1644–47, 1648: Sir Robert Grierson of Lag
 1643: John Laurie of Maxwelton
During the Commonwealth of England, Scotland and Ireland, the sheriffdom of Dumfries was represented by one Member of Parliament in the Protectorate Parliament at Westminster.
 1654–55: James Johnstone, 2nd Earl of Hartfell
 1656–58: George Smith
After the Restoration, the Parliament of Scotland was again summoned to meet in Edinburgh.
 1661–63: James Crichton of St Leonards 
 1661–63, 1665 (convention), 1667 (convention), 1669–72, 1678 (convention): Robert Fergusson of Craigdarroch 
 1665 (convention), 1667 (convention), 1669–74, 1678 (convention), 1681–82, 1685: Sir Robert Dalzell of Glenae (died 1685)
 1678 (convention), 1681–82, 1685–86: Sir Robert Grierson of Lagg
 1686, 1689 (convention): Sir John Dalzell of Glenae (died 1689)
 1690: James Johnstone of Corhead (died c.1690) 
 1690–1701: William Creichtone of Craufurdstone (died c.1701)
 1689 (convention), 1689–99: Sir James Johnstone of Westerhall (died c.1700)
 1690–1702: Sir Thomas Kirkpatrick of Closeburn
 1693–1701: Alexander Johnstone of Elsiesheills  
 1700–02, 1702–07: Sir John Johnstone of Westerhall
 1702–07: William Douglass of Dornock 
 1702, 1702–07: John Sharp of Hoddam 
 1702–07: Alexander Fergussone of Isle

References

See also
 List of constituencies in the Parliament of Scotland at the time of the Union

Constituencies of the Parliament of Scotland (to 1707)
Constituencies disestablished in 1707
1707 disestablishments in Scotland